The initials TNK may refer to: 
 Tenecteplase (TNK) - an enzyme used as a thrombolytic drug
 TNK-BP Ltd. - a Russian oil company
 The Japanese animation studio TNK
TNK - a Turkish band
 The Beatles song Tomorrow Never Knows
TN Krishnan, Indian violinist
Tanakh - the Hebrew Bible
 Tin King stop - a Light Rail stop in Hong Kong